The 1961 Formula One season was the 15th season of Formula One motor racing. It featured the 1961 World Championship of Drivers and the 1961 International Cup for F1 Manufacturers, which were contested concurrently from 14 May to 8 October over an eight race series. The season also included numerous non-championship races for Formula One cars.

Phil Hill of Ferrari won his only Drivers' Championship after his teammate and rival Wolfgang von Trips was killed at the Italian Grand Prix, the penultimate race of the season. Ferrari won its first F1 manufacturers' title. Hill was the first, and so far only American-born driver to win the World Championship, as the other American champion, Mario Andretti, was born in Italy.

The 1961 season was the first to feature only a single tyre supplier as Firestone decided to withdraw from the sport after eleven seasons.

Season summary 
The first year of the 1.5-litre formula was dominated by a well-prepared Ferrari team – the 1961 season was the first time they made a mid-engined car, the legendary 156 "Sharknose" - going against team boss Enzo Ferrari's dislike of mid-engined cars and his old-fashioned belief that mid-engined cars were built by people who did not have enough horsepower. Only Stirling Moss, in an outdated Lotus, was able to beat the Ferraris on two tracks where his skills offset the Ferrari power advantage. Innes Ireland also won a race, the 1961 United States Grand Prix, after Ferrari did not enter the race. Giancarlo Baghetti in a privately-entered Ferrari won the French Grand Prix on his championship debut, the only driver to have done so other than Nino Farina, winner of the first Formula One World Championship race. Baghetti had also won his only two previous Formula One races, the non-championship events at Syracuse and Naples, but the French race was his only win in the World Championship. The contest for the championship between Ferrari's leading drivers, Phil Hill and Wolfgang von Trips, ended in tragedy when von Trips collided with Jim Clark at Monza, killing von Trips and 14 spectators. Hill went on to win the championship, the first American driver to do so. The Indianapolis 500, a race that was run to completely different regulations to a Grand Prix and had almost nothing to do with European-style road racing, was dropped from the championship.

The number of points awarded to a race winner was increased to nine for the World Championship of Drivers.

Besides von Trips, two other drivers died during this season: Briton Shane Summers during the non-championship Silver City Trophy event at Brands Hatch, and Italian Giulio Cabianca during a test at the Modena Autodrome.

Teams and drivers

The following teams and drivers competed in the 1961 FIA World Championship. All teams competed with tyres supplied by Dunlop.

Calendar

Calendar changes
The Argentine Grand Prix was dropped from the calendar with the retirements of Juan Manuel Fangio in 1958 and José Froilán González in 1960, combined with unstable governments after the exile of then President of Argentina Juan Peron in 1955.

The Portuguese Grand Prix was dropped from the calendar.

The British Grand Prix was moved from Silverstone to Aintree, in keeping with the event-sharing arrangement between the two circuits.

The German Grand Prix returned to the calendar for 1961, the 1960 race was initially supposed to be held at the AVUS circuit, but the race was cancelled after drivers complained about the extreme danger of the track. The German Grand Prix was held in 1960 but was run as a Formula 2 race at the Nürburgring but on the Südschleife version instead of the Nordschleife.

With six weeks to go to the planned raceday it was deciced the United States Grand Prix would move from Riverside International Raceway in California to Watkins Glen International in New York because of the lack of spectators attending and prize money being paid.

The Moroccan Grand Prix was originally scheduled to be held on 29 October as the last race of the year but was cancelled for the third year in a row for monetary reasons.

Season review

Pre-season non-championship races
Before the 1961 Formula One season was to start in Monaco in mid-May, many non-championship races were held throughout Europe. The first was the Lombank Trophy, a joint Formula One and Intercontinental Formula race, at the fast 2.7-mile Snetterton circuit in eastern England. Most of the top drivers of the day, such as Stirling Moss, Jim Clark, Graham Hill, Phil Hill and Wolfgang von Trips were in the United States competing in the prestigious 12 Hours of Sebring sportscar race. Still, two top drivers—John Surtees and defending champion Jack Brabham—were in attendance. Brabham won the race in an Intercontinental Cooper while Surtees finished third, first of the Formula One entrants.

A week later, the Glover Trophy at the fast Goodwood circuit in southern England was held, with Surtees winning in a privately entered Cooper, ahead of Graham Hill in a works BRM, Surtees's teammate Roy Salvadori in a Cooper and Moss in a Rob Walker-entered Lotus. On the same day, the Pau Grand Prix in southwest France was won by Clark driving a works Lotus. Six days later, the Brussels Grand Prix at Heysel Park was won by Brabham in a works Cooper. Seven days after that, Moss won the Vienna Grand Prix in Austria, held at an aerodrome in Aspern, Vienna. Six days later, on a Friday, the Aintree 200 in Liverpool was won by Brabham in wet conditions, and three days later, the prestigious Syracuse Grand Prix in Sicily was won by Giancarlo Baghetti in a Ferrari – his first ever Formula One race.

Race 1: Monaco

The 1961 Formula One season did not officially start until May, eight days after the BRDC race in England. Practice saw Clark crash his Lotus heavily at turn one, and Lotus's woes continued when Innes Ireland crashed in the tunnel during the final session, destroying his car and breaking his leg. Moss took pole in his Rob Walker Lotus with Richie Ginther's Ferrari and Clark's Lotus sharing the front row. Graham and Phil Hill shared the second row. This particular Monaco Grand Prix turned out to be a classic, with one of the greatest driving performances in the history of Formula One by Stirling Moss in a privately entered Lotus against three Ferraris with a lot more power but worse handling than the Lotus.

At the start, Ginther took the lead from Clark and Moss, but Clark soon had to pit with fuel pump problems, and so Jo Bonnier and Dan Gurney took third and fourth in their Porsches. On Lap 14, both Moss and Bonnier were able to pass Ginther, and 10 laps later Phil Hill passed both Ginther and Bonnier to move into second but there was no way he was going to catch Moss, who was driving one of the greatest races of his illustrious career. Towards mid-distance Ginther fought back, passing Hill for second and chasing after Moss, closing the gap to just three seconds. Moss responded, driving on the limit the entire way and eventually won the race. Hill finished third and Wolfgang von Trips was classified fourth despite crashing on the last lap.

The 19th Naples Grand Prix in southern Italy, held on the same day as the Monaco Grand Prix, at the Posillipo Park circuit and it was won by Baghetti- who had won two Formula One races from two starts.

Race 2: Netherlands

There were just eight days between Monaco and the Dutch Grands Prix. The Dutch race was held at the Zandvoort circuit located in small sand dunes right next to a popular beach 20 miles west of Amsterdam. The injured Innes Ireland was replaced at Team Lotus by Trevor Taylor but otherwise the field was much as it had been at Monaco, with local hero Carel Godin de Beaufort getting a drive in one of the Porsches, entered by his Ecurie Maarsbergen. Ferrari monopolised the front row of the grid with Phil Hill on pole from von Trips and Ginther, while Moss's Walker Lotus and Graham Hill's BRM shared the second row.

At the start, von Trips took the lead with Graham Hill in a works BRM and Phil Hill behind him. Graham Hill soon began to fall back, dropping quickly behind Phil Hill and Clark, who had stormed through the field from the fourth row to run fourth at the end of the first lap. Clark proceeded to battle for second place with the Ferrari and they exchanged places several times before Phil Hill finally asserted himself. Further back Graham Hill battled with Moss and Ginther, but it was von Trips who emerged ahead for most of the race, and won it. On the last lap, however, Ginther went wide when his throttle stuck open and Moss was able to grab fourth.

The 1961 Dutch Grand Prix has a remarkable place in F1 history: every starter finished the race and no-one went into the pits. Such reliability has never been achieved since, made even more remarkable by the fact that Formula One cars were far from reliable machines during a race.

The London Trophy was held at the short, tight and twisty Crystal Palace circuit in London the day after the Dutch Grand Prix, and it was won by Salvadori driving a Yeoman Credit Cooper, whilst another English race, the Silver City Trophy at the undulating and twisty Brands Hatch circuit nearby Crystal Palace was held in wet conditions and was won by Moss in a Walker Lotus, but was marred by the death of 24-year-old Welshman Shane Summers in a Cooper, who was killed almost instantly when he spun at the challenging, anti-cambered Paddock Hill Bend, went off and crashed into a concrete wall near an underground tunnel entrance.

Race 3: Belgium

A year after the traumatic 1960 Belgian Grand Prix, the F1 teams gathered again at the very fast and frighteningly daunting 8.7 mile Spa-Francorchamps public road circuit near Liège with a few changes from the Dutch Grand Prix three weeks previously. Innes Ireland, who had broken his leg at Monaco, was back in action for Team Lotus, which had new Lotus 21s for Ireland and Jim Clark. Ferrari had a fourth car painted up in Belgian racing yellow for Olivier Gendebien, which was being run by Ecurie Nationale Belge, which also had a pair of Emeryson chassis for Lucien Bianchi and Willy Mairesse. These were both damaged in practice and so Bianchi and Mairesse took over the non-qualified Lotus 18's with Tony Marsh and Wolfgang Seidel. British Racing Partnership was also in trouble with only one Lotus 18 to be shared by Cliff Allison and Henry Taylor. The team decided that the fastest driver would race, and as a result Allison went too fast, crashed heavily at Blanchimont, rolled the car and suffered severe leg injuries which would end his F1 career.

Phil Hill took pole with von Trips alongside while Gendebien made the most of his local experience to take third despite using a less powerful engine than the factory Ferraris. Ginther's Ferrari shared the second row with Surtees in Reg Parnell's Cooper-Climax.

Phil Hill took the lead at the start but was then passed by Gendebien while von Trips and Ginther joined in. The four Ferrari cars, well suited to this power circuit thanks to the formidable performance of their 120-degree V6 engines dominated the race and the lead changed several times before Phil Hill took the lead from von Trips and Ginther. Gendebien was fourth giving Ferrari a straight 1-2-3-4 result. Phil Hill fought von Trips all the way and the Phil Hill finished 0.7 seconds ahead of von Trips. Surtees was fifth although he had to battle early in the race with Graham Hill's BRM which eventually went out with electrical trouble. Gurney finished sixth in his Porsche.

Race 4: France

A fortnight after the Belgian GP the F1 teams gathered at the very fast, straight dominated Reims public road circuit for the French Grand Prix in Champagne country. As the French did not bother with the restrictive invitations it was a large field of cars with a variety of unusual privateers. Ferrari had a fourth car, run in the colors of the Federazione Italiana Scuderie Automobilische and driven by Baghetti who arrived at Reims undefeated. There was a new De Tomaso-Osca which was run by Scuderia Serenissima for Giorgio Scarlatti but it was not competitive. It was an all-Ferrari front row with Phil Hill on pole from Wolfgang Von Trips and Ritchie Ginther with the second row being shared by Stirling Moss in his Rob Walker Lotus 18 and Jim Clark in one of the factory Lotus 21s.

The race weekend was held in extremely hot conditions, and the track began to break up at the track's 2 hairpins. The ambient temperature on Sunday/race day was 102°F (39°C), and the race turned out to be yet another classic. Hill led from the start with Ginther and Von Trips giving chase but when Ginther spun Moss was able to take third for a while before the American recovered. Further back, there was an exciting slipstreaming battle between seven cars: the two Porsches of Dan Gurney and Jo Bonnier, the factory Lotuses of Clark and Ireland, Graham Hill's BRM (Tony Brooks went out early in the other car with engine trouble), Bruce McLaren's Cooper and the fourth Ferrari of Baghetti. Eventually Ginther passed Moss and he dropped back into this fight because of brake trouble. Then the Ferrari team faltered. Von Trips, who had taken the lead under team orders, stopped with engine trouble on lap 18. Hill took over but spun on lap 38 and stalled his engine, re-joining a lap behind. Ginther lasted only three laps in the lead before he stopped with an engine problem and suddenly the seething battle for fourth place was a fight for the lead. Gradually the challengers dropped away leaving Gurney's Porsche against Baghetti's Ferrari. They changed places lap after lap and on the final lap Baghetti dived out of Gurney's slipstream to pass the American a couple of hundred yards before the finish line. Baghetti thus became the first and, to date, only man to win his first World Championship event.

Race 5: Britain
Thirteen days later the British Grand Prix was held at the Aintree circuit in Liverpool, site of England's Grand National horse race. The field at Aintree was not very different from that which had been seen at Reims, although Rob Walker ran a four-wheel-drive Ferguson for Jack Fairman, although this was also driven by Stirling Moss during practice. There were four Ferraris again, with the unbeaten Giancarlo Baghetti joining the works trio. Qualifying saw Phil Hill, Ritchie Ginther, Jo Bonnier (Porsche) and Wolfgang Von Trips all set identical lap times, while Moss was alongside Von Trips on the second row in his Walker Lotus 18.

The race began in heavy rain with Phil Hill, Von Trips and Ginther getting ahead at the start, chased by Moss and Bonnier. Von Trips took the lead after seven laps, passing Hill. Moss moved to third when Ginther ran wide at one point and then managed to get past Hill for second. He chased Von Trips but was never able to pass him. When the rain stopped Moss began to drop back and would retire with brake problems. This allowed the Ferraris to finish 1-2-3 with Von Trips winning over Hill and Ginther. Jack Brabham, Bonnier and Roy Salvadori (Reg Parnell Cooper) completed the top six. The unbeaten Baghetti crashed out early in the race. Moss took over Fairman's Ferguson after he had retired but was eventually called into the pits and disqualified for having received a push-start.

The Solitude Grand Prix in Germany was held a week after the British Grand Prix on the very demanding and dangerous seven mile Solitude circuit near Porsche and Mercedes-Benz's hometown of Stuttgart. This race was won by Briton Innes Ireland in a works Lotus.

Race 6: Germany
The German Grand Prix, held at the fearsome, twisty, very dangerous and extremely challenging 14.2 mile Nürburgring circuit for the first time since 1958 featured a huge field of cars with Ferrari turning up with four cars, Wolfgang Von Trips, Phil Hill and Ritchie Ginther being joined by Willy Mairesse, although the Belgian had an older engine in his car. Jack Brabham had the new Climax V8 FWMV engine for the first time in his factory Cooper, while Porsche had four cars, Edgar Barth joining Jo Bonnier, Dan Gurney and Hans Herrmann. Qualifying saw Hill record a remarkable lap of 8:55.2 – the first time anyone had lapped the Nordschleife in under nine minutes. This time which was nearly six seconds faster than Brabham's best, with Moss third quickest in his Rob Walker Lotus 18. Bonnier completed the front row in his Porsche. The second row featured Von Trips, Graham Hill in his BRM and Gurney.

The race started in damp conditions and Brabham led the field away only to spin out and crash on that first lap. Phil Hill charged up and took the lead, but Moss passed the American before they reached the finish line to start the second lap. Moss would stay ahead for the rest of the race while Von Trips came up and overtook Hill for second after a long battle. Towards the end of the race it started to rain, but Moss never took off his intermediate tires, and this allowed Moss to extend his lead, and won a superb victory with a Lotus that had superior handling to the Ferrari – essential at the Nürburgring.

There was a three-week break between the German Grand Prix and the Swedish Kanonloppet, a non-championship race near Stockholm, and a week after that, the Danish Grand Prix at Roskilde near Copenhagen and a week after that the Modena Grand Prix near Ferrari's headquarters was held and all three of these races were won by Moss in the Walker Lotus.

Race 7: Italy
The penultimate race of the 1961 World Championship was to be a showdown between two Ferrari drivers. The team had already won the Constructors' title so it was a straight fight between Wolfgang Von Trips and Phil Hill for the Drivers' title although Moss still had a mathematical chance of victory if he won both races. The advantage lay with Wolfgang Von Trips who had 33 points to Phil Hill's 29. The Ferrari team had a new recruit at the Monza Autodrome near Milan, 19-year old Mexican Ricardo Rodriguez taking over the team's fourth car while Giancarlo Baghetti re-appeared in a private Ferrari. Once again Jack Brabham was the only driver with the new Climax V8 engine. Stirling Moss ran his usual Lotus 18 but was not happy with it and Innes Ireland let him have his factory Lotus 21. The organisers, wanting to give the advantage to the Ferrari team decided to use the combined oval/road course again making this Monza the fastest circuit of the year. This circuit had been boycotted by the British teams last year because of the terrible quality of the extremely rough and bumpy concrete banking, which was of such poor quality and design that it even went as far as to badly affect the structural strength and reliability of the cars, particularly in regards to the cars' chassis and suspension but the British teams relented and they all competed in this year's event. As expected the powerful Ferraris were impressive, Von Trips was on pole with Rodriguez second (becoming the youngest driver ever to start a World Championship Grand Prix) ahead of Ginther and Phil Hill with Graham Hill's BRM sharing the third row with Baghetti. 

This Italian Grand Prix was to be marred by one of the worst tragedies in the history of motor racing, and would cast a shadow over the Italian Grand Prix for years. At the start, Phil Hill and Ginther managed to get into first and second places followed by Rodriguez, the fast-starting Jim Clark and Von Trips. Approaching the Parabolica the two cars collided. Clark crashed without injury but the Ferrari went through a spectator fence, went up an embankment on the left and was tossed into a roll, into where spectators were standing. Von Trips was thrown from the car, landed on the track, broke his neck and was killed along with 14 spectators. The race organisers decided not to stop the race and the Ferrari team put on a display until Rodriguez, Baghetti and Ginther all stopped with mechanical trouble. This left Phil Hill to win. Of the rest, Brabham went out with engine trouble while Surtees retired after running to the back of Bonnier who had slowed his Porsche at the site of Von Trips's accident. Moss went out with a broken wheel which left Dan Gurney second for Porsche and Bruce McLaren third for Cooper. Jack Lewis drove a marvellous race in his private Cooper to finish fourth ahead of Tony Brooks (BRM) and Roy Salvadori (Parnell Cooper). Von Trips's fatal retirement meant that Phil Hill became the first American to win the Formula 1 World Championship.

Race 8: United States
The only non-European championship race of 1961 was the United States GP, which was being held at the 2.3 mile Watkins Glen circuit in upstate New York for the first time 4 weeks after the tragic Italian race. Having won both World Championships Ferrari decided not to bother crossing the Atlantic, denying Phil Hill the chance to race at the Glen. Not counting the famous Indianapolis 500, run to totally different regulations and not included again on the Grand Prix calendar from 1961 onwards, this was the 3rd time the US GP had been held since the international championship started in 1950, with one off-spells at Sebring in Florida and Riverside in southern California failing to achieve any success. Watkins Glen would continuously host the US GP up until 1980.

Both Jack Brabham and Stirling Moss had the new Climax V8 engine on this occasion but Moss decided after practice not to race it. The field was joined by a number of local stars, notably Hap Sharp and Roger Penske in Coopers and Jim Hall and Ken Miles in Lotuses. Brabham took pole position with Graham Hill alongside while Moss shared the second row with Bruce McLaren in the second factory Cooper.

A paid crowd of 28,000 (total around 60,000) on Sunday made the sponsors extremely happy and also boded well for the race's future. At the start, Brabham led the field off the grid and into the first corner, but before the end of the first lap, Moss had moved by into the lead. These two were followed by Ireland (up from eighth), Hill, Dan Gurney, Masten Gregory and McLaren. On lap three, McLaren moved up to third when Ireland spun on oil at the end of the straight. "I nearly went out of the race," he said. "I went into a whirl, a 360-degree spin, cars were whipping past." He recovered and continued in eleventh.

By lap 10, Ireland had already stormed his way back to fourth, behind McLaren's Cooper, as Moss and Brabham continued to draw away at a second a lap, swapping the lead back and forth. At about one-third distance, on lap 34, Brabham's V8 began to leak water and overheat. With puffs of smoke appearing from the left-side exhaust, the Cooper dropped back from Moss and finally entered the pits on lap 45. After taking on water and returning to the race, Brabham completed only seven more laps before retiring.

Leading now by over 40 seconds, Moss seemed on his way to a comfortable victory. Only he knew, however, that his oil pressure was dropping, and on lap 59, the dark blue Lotus peeled off and retired suddenly, handing the lead to Ireland. Hill was right on the tail of the Scot, hounding him for 15 laps, until he, too, suddenly coasted down the pit lane with a loose magneto wire. The next challenger was Roy Salvadori, who began trimming the lead from 20 seconds down to five with only five laps left. But it was Ireland's day. With just over three laps remaining, Salvadori's privately entered Cooper blew its engine, just as his teammate John Surtees' car had done on the first lap.

Ireland came home under the waving chequered flag of Tex Hopkins, less than five seconds ahead of American Dan Gurney, as Britain's Tony Brooks finished the last GP of his career in third. It was a race of milestones: Innes Ireland's only career win, the first win for Team Lotus, and the first American Grand Prix to turn a profit, ensuring its return in 1962. Unfortunately for Stirling Moss, it would be his last World Championship race, as his career was ended by a heavy accident during the 1962 Glover Trophy race at Goodwood the following April.

Results and standings

Grands Prix

World Drivers' Championship standings

Points were awarded on a 9–6–4–3–2–1 basis to the first six finishers at each race. However, only the best five results from the eight races were retained.

 Italics indicate fastest lap 
 Bold indicates pole position

International Cup for F1 Manufacturers standings
Points were awarded on an 8–6–4–3–2–1 basis to the first six finishers at each race. However, a manufacturer only received points for its highest placed car and only the best five results from the eight races were retained.

 Only the best five results counted towards the championship. Numbers without parentheses are championship points; numbers in parentheses are total points scored.
Bold results counted to championship totals.

Non-championship races
Other Formula One races also held in 1961, which did not count towards the World Championship.

A pink background indicates an Intercontinental Formula race. A blue background indicates a combined Formula One and Intercontinental Formula race.

References

External links
 1961 images at the Cahier Archive

Formula One seasons